Quân khu 7 Stadium (7th Military Region Stadium) is a stadium in Tan Binh District, near Tan Son Nhat International Airport, Ho Chi Minh City. It has a capacity of around 25,000 people.

History
Before the Fall of Saigon, the stadium was called "Republic of Vietnam Military Stadium" or simply "Military Stadium"; it was also known as "Pershing Field Ball Park", named after Pershing Field in New Jersey, to American soldiers. This was the site of a bombing incident on February 9, 1964 that killed 2 and injured 20 people. The stadium was completely rebuilt in 2003.

Tenants
This was the Tổng Tham Mưu ARVN soccer club's home stadium from 1952 until 1975. After renovations, the stadium hosted one men's football match as part of the 2003 Southeast Asian Games. It was also one of the venues of 2007 AFC Asian Cup finals, hosted by four South-East Asian countries, Indonesia, Malaysia, Thailand and Vietnam. Quân khu 7 Stadium was the home field for Quân khu 7 F.C. before the club was transferred in 2009, as well as Thép Miền Nam Cảng Sài Gòn F.C. (now known as Hồ Chí Minh City F.C.) for 2007 V-League.

Below are some of the international football matches played at Quân khu 7 Stadium:

Entertainment

Through the years, the stadium remains the favorite choice for large-scale entertainment events in the city due to its design. The stadium's stand A is covered by a roof and seating 6,700 people - more than the capacity of the city's largest indoor venue (Phu Tho Indoor Stadium) and similar to the comparable section at the older Thong Nhat Stadium. At an optimal concert configuration, the stadium could hold up to 18,000 people.

Korean artist Rain had two concerts in this stadium in 2006 and 2007. In 2008, American alternative rock band My Chemical Romance had a concert here as part of Tiger's United08 Concert. In 2010, The Click Five had a concert here as a part of MTV EXIT concerts in several Vietnam cities. In 2011, Backstreet Boys and David Archuleta held their own concerts here as part of their respective Asian tour. Ariana Grande was scheduled to perform her first concert in Vietnam at the stadium on August 23, 2017, but then she had to cancel the due to her sickness.

References

Football venues in Vietnam
AFC Asian Cup stadiums
Sports venues in Ho Chi Minh City